Hewitson is an English family name. The name comes from the patronym of the given name Hewitt, meaning "son of Hewitt".  Such patronymic surnames were formed by using the ending -son to the genitive form of the father's name to indicate "son of".

Notable people with the surname include:
Bob Hewitson (1884–1957), footballer
Bobby Hewitson (1892–1969), first curator of the Hockey Hall of Fame in Toronto, Canada
Iain Hewitson (born 1948), New Zealand-born chef who moved to Australia
James Hewitson (1892–1963), English recipient of the Victoria Cross
Laura Hewitson, British-born primate researcher noted for her work in the fields of reproductive biology and behaviour
Mark Hewitson (1897–1973), British trade union official and Labour Party politician
William Chapman Hewitson (1806–1878), British naturalist

See also
Hewitson River, short river in Thunder Bay District, northwestern Ontario, Canada
Hewitson's Small Tree-nymph (Ideopsis hewitsonii), species of nymphalid butterfly in the Danainae subfamily

References

Germanic-language surnames

pt:Hewitson
ru:Hewitson